All About the Benjamins: Original Motion Picture Soundtrack is the soundtrack to Kevin Bray's 2002 action-comedy film All About the Benjamins. It was released on February 19, 2002 through New Line Records, and features hip hop and R&B music. The album peaked at #65 on the Billboard 200, #12 on the Top R&B/Hip-Hop Albums, #3 on the Independent Albums and #7 on the Top Soundtracks, and featured one charting single, "Told Y'all" by Trina and Rick Ross.

Track listing

Charts

References

External links

2002 soundtrack albums
Hip hop soundtracks
New Line Records soundtracks
Albums produced by Buckwild
Albums produced by Mike City
Albums produced by Cool & Dre
Albums produced by Mannie Fresh
Albums produced by Esmond Edwards
Albums produced by Tricky Stewart
Albums produced by Chris Stokes (director)
Action film soundtracks
Comedy film soundtracks